is a Japanese singer. First performing solo and later with her band , she was one of the best known acts of the early eighties, and received some international attention as one of the Japanese acts in the Hurricane Irene Aid Concert.

References

External links
 

1959 births
Japanese women singers
Living people
People from Fujisawa, Kanagawa
Musicians from Kanagawa Prefecture
Ferris University alumni